Green Cross (Grünkreuz) is a World War I chemical warfare pulmonary agent consisting of chloropicrin (PS, Aquinite, Klop), phosgene (CG, Collongite) and/or trichloromethyl chloroformate (Surpalite, Perstoff).

Green Cross is also a generic World War I German marking for artillery shells with pulmonary agents (chemical payload affecting the lungs). The tip of the projectile with the fuse end painted green and a green cross at the bottom of the cartridge.

Other Green Cross mixtures were based on phosgene and/or diphosgene.

The first use of Green Cross was on May 31 1915 in a German offensive in Ypres. The mixture was chlorine-phosgene, with 95% and 5%.

See also 
 Blue Cross (chemical warfare)
 Yellow Cross (chemical warfare)
 White Cross (chemical warfare)

References

Pulmonary agents
World War I chemical weapons